I, Claudius is a 1976 BBC Television adaptation of Robert Graves' I, Claudius and Claudius the God. Written by Jack Pulman, it was one of the corporation's most successful drama serials of all time. It also provided popular initial exposure for several actors who would eventually become well known, such as Derek Jacobi, Patrick Stewart, John Rhys-Davies and John Hurt.

Note that the first night broadcast consisted of showing two episodes edited into a single double-length (billed as "Feature Length) episode, resulting in a count of 12 nights for 13 hours of airtime.

Episodes
The first episode (titled "A Touch of Murder") was split into two when it aired on the PBS anthology series Masterpiece Theatre. "Family Affairs" is the title that was given to that second episode, creating a 13th episode for American viewers.

References

 British Film Institute Film & TV Database entry for I, Claudius

I, Claudius
I, Claudius